Woolston, in the south of the county of Shropshire, England, is a hamlet located in the parish of Wistanstow, one mile northwest of that village, near Craven Arms (in the Church Stretton and Craven Arms county electoral division of Shropshire unitary authority, previously part of the district of South Shropshire until its abolition in 2009).

In the mediaeval period the name was variously spelt Wolfreston, Wolureston and Wylfriston; the Domesday Book survey recorded that in 1066 it had been held by Spirtes the priest along with Wistanstow.

References

Hamlets in Shropshire